Cut It Out is the second extended play (EP) by American indie rock band Kitten. It was released on May 2, 2011.

Background
Produced by Chad Anderson and Gavin Mackillop, the EP includes six songs with a running time of 25:50. Three singles, “Cut It Out”, “G#” and “Japanese Eyes”, were followed by their own respective music videos, which can be found on the band’s YouTube page. 
The song “Christina” was originally written about Christina Ricci, but the band later confirmed that they had changed a few lyrics because it "felt too specific."

Kitten's frontwoman, Chloe Chaidez, describes the sound of their sophomore EP as more "electronic" and "rock" than the previous, citing a strong '80s influence. Yahoo described the EP as a "frenzied but melodic blend of danceable pop with an undercurrent of raw post-punk and 80s new wave; ...filled with irresistible melodies, incessant hooks, and Chaidez's provocative lyricism."

Track listing

Release history

References

External links
 

2011 EPs
Atlantic Records EPs
Elektra Records EPs
Kitten (band) albums